Kevin Dowling is an American film, television director and producer. Throughout his career, Kevin has worked in over 60 projects.

Biography

Early life and New York theater
Kevin Dowling was raised in Gladwyne, Pennsylvania, a suburb of Philadelphia, the son of Dr. John J. Dowling, who in the late 1980s was chief of orthopedic surgery at the Lankenau Medical Center in Wynnewood, Pennsylvania, and a clinical professor of orthopedic surgery at Thomas Jefferson University; and Lynn Dowling. He attended Oberlin College, in Ohio, and New York University, in New York City. On May 9, 1987, Dowling married Marley Klaus, at the time a producer/writer of the CBS News television program 60 Minutes.

Dowling was a founding member and, for eight years, the artistic director of The Actor's Ensemble. During this time, he directed more than 20 plays, including the first full scale New York production of Lanford Wilson's "This Is The Rill Speaking," the New York premiere of Dan Lauria's "Game Plan," his own "A Child's Piece," and revivals of plays by Harold Pinter and Sam Shepard. He later produced Mr. Shepard's comedy hit "True West," which ran for two years at the Cherry Lane Theatre and featured during its run such actors as: John Malkovich, Gary Sinise, James Belushi, Gary Cole, Randy Quaid, & Dennis Quaid. He also served as Artistic Director of the Cherry Lane Theatre from 1982 to 1995.

Dowling's first show on Broadway was as a producer and director of Larry Shue's who Broadway play The Nerd, which ran 15 previews and 441 performances at the Helen Hayes Theatre from March 10, 1987, to April 10, 1988. Dowling then served as Executive Producer of the Forbidden Broadway 1988/1989 edition of the annual Off-Broadway satirical revue, which ran 534 performances, from September 15, 1988 to December 24, 1989, at Theater East in New York City.

Following these initial works, Dowling directed and produced, David Stevens' Off-Broadway play The Sum of Us, which won the 1991 Outer Critics Circle Award for Best Off-Broadway Play and took a 1991 Obie Award for star Tony Goldwyn. It ran 335 performances from October 16, 1990, to August 4, 1991, at the Cherry Lane Theatre. Dowling then served as Executive Producer of the Off-Broadway musical Pageant, (April 23, 1991 – June 7, 1992), which garnered Outer Critics Circle Award nominations for Best Off-Broadway Musical and Best Off-Broadway Book, Music and Lyrics; and produced the Broadway musical Buddy: The Buddy Holly Story (November 4, 1990 – May 19, 1991), and the Off-Broadway play Hauptman (May 19 – June 14, 1992).

Film and TV
Dowling made his film directorial debut directing the 1995 movie adaptation The Sum of Us, based on the Australia-set Off-Broadway play Dowling had directed. Despite his experience with the material, Dowling found it difficult to be assigned as director for the movie, which starred Jack Thompson and Russell Crowe. "In Hollywood they think directing a movie is nuclear physics and it can never be mastered by a mere stage director," he said at the time. "They wanted someone else to direct, and they wanted to shoot it [in the United States]. They didn't think it would make any money if it was set in Australia," a locale he "fought to keep". Hoping to raise both American and Australian capital to make the film, Dowling went to Sydney; when his prospective American backer died, Australian sources pressed to have a native direct. To complete the financial arrangements, Dowling accepted a co-directing credit with Australian cinematographer Geoff Burton, and agreed to use an Australian cast.

He went on to direct, and serve as executive producer of, the 1996 film Mojave Moon, starring Danny Aiello, Anne Archer and Angelina Jolie. He then directed the 1998 cable-TV movie Last Rites, starring Randy Quaid and Embeth Davidtz, which premiered on Starz / Encore.

After the 1999 TV-movie Silk Hope came the first of a long string of episodic-TV directing credits, the first-season episode "Near Death Experience" of the drama series Judging Amy. He would direct seven more episodes through season five, as well as episodes of series including The Americans, The Strain, Bosch, Resurrection, Heroes, Outsourced, Dead Like Me, Ed, Gilmore Girls, The District, Joan of Arcadia, Law & Order: Criminal Intent, CSI:NY, and The Mentalist, as well as the pilot and all eight episodes of the 2008–2009 romantic comedy-drama series Valentine, and all episodes except the pilot of the 2007 drama series K-Ville.

He developed the concept and directed the pilot  of the 2011 USA Network drama series Necessary Roughness, and was Executive Producer for all three seasons of the series, also directing eight episodes during that time.

Filmography

References

External links

Film producers from Pennsylvania
American television directors
Television producers from Pennsylvania
American theatre directors
Living people
People from Lower Merion Township, Pennsylvania
Year of birth missing (living people)
Film directors from Pennsylvania